The Married Women's Property Act 1882 (45 & 46 Vict. c.75) was an Act of the Parliament of the United Kingdom that significantly altered English law regarding the property rights of married women, which besides other matters allowed married women to own and control property in their own right.

The Act applied in England (and Wales) and Ireland, but did not extend to Scotland. The Married Women's Property Act was a model for similar legislation in other British territories. For example, Victoria passed legislation in 1884, New South Wales in 1889, and the remaining Australian colonies passed similar legislation between 1890 and 1897.

English women's property rights 
English common law defined the role of the wife as a feme covert, emphasising her subordination to her husband, and putting her under the "protection and influence of her husband, her baron, or lord". Upon marriage, the husband and wife became one person under the law, as the property of the wife was surrendered to her husband, and her status as a separate legal personality, with the ability to own property, and sue and be sued solely in her own name, ceased to exist. Any personal property acquired by the wife during the marriage, unless specified that it was for her own separate use, went automatically to her husband. If a woman writer had copyright before marriage, the copyright would pass to the husband afterwards, for instance. Further, a married woman was unable to draft a will or dispose of any property without her husband's consent.

Women were limited in what they could inherit. Males were more likely to receive real property (land), while females with brothers were sometimes limited to inherited personal property, which included clothing, jewellery, household furniture, food, and all moveable goods. In an instance where no will was found, the English law of primogeniture automatically gave the oldest son the right to all real property, and the daughter only inherited real property in the absence of a male heir. The law of intestate primogeniture remained on the statute books in Britain until the 1925 property legislation simplified and updated England's archaic law of real property.

Aware of their daughters' unfortunate situation, fathers often provided them with dowries or worked into a prenuptial agreement pin money, the estate which the wife was to possess for her sole and separate use not subject to the control of her husband, to provide her with an income separate from his. This could be done by conveying property to 'feoffees-to-use', or trustees, who would legally hold the property 'to her use', and for which she would be the equitable and beneficial owner. The wife would then receive the benefits of the property through her control of the trustees and her right in the law of equity as the beneficial owner.

In contrast to wives, women who never married or who were widowed maintained control over their property and inheritance, owned land and controlled property disposal, since by law any unmarried adult female was a femme sole. Once married, the only way that women could reclaim property was through widowhood. The few exceptions of married women who were femmes sole were queens of England, and Margaret Beaufort, who was declared to be a femme sole by a 1485 act of parliament passed by her son, in spite of the fact Beaufort was still married to Thomas Stanley, Earl of Derby.

The dissolution of a marriage, whether initiated by the husband or wife, usually left the divorced females impoverished, as the law offered them no rights to marital property. The 1836 Caroline Norton court case highlighted the injustice of English property laws, and generated enough support to result in the Married Women's Property Act.

The Act 
After years of political lobbying, the Married Women's Property Act addressed the grievances presented by English women. The Act altered the common law doctrine of coverture to include the wife's right to own, buy and sell her separate property. Wives' legal identities were also restored, as the courts were forced to recognize a husband and a wife as two separate legal entities, in the same manner as if the wife was a feme sole. Married women's legal rights included the right to sue and be sued. Any damages a wife might pay would be her own responsibility, instead of that of her husband. Married women were then also liable for their own debts, and any outside trade they owned was subject to bankruptcy laws. Further, married women were able to hold stock in their own names. Elizabeth Cady Stanton credited Ursula Bright with the achievement in getting the bill passed, writing 'for ten consecutive years she gave her special attention to this bill … was unwearied in her efforts, in rolling up petitions, scattering tracts, holding meetings'

As of 2016, most of the Act has been repealed.  The remaining sections are 6, 10, 11 and 17.  Of these, one of the more important was s. 11, which provided that a widow could in her own right enforce her late husband's life assurance policy. (Also, the Contracts (Rights of Third Parties) Act 1999 enables both men and women to enforce contracts drawn up by others for their benefit.)

See also
Coverture
Married Women's Property Act 1870
Married Women's Property Acts in the United States
Primogeniture

Further reading 
 Amy Louise Erickson, Women and Property in Early Modern England (London: Routledge, 1993).
 Dorothy Stetson, A Woman's Issue: The Politics of Family Law Reform in England (London: Greenwood, 1982).
 Mary Lyndon Shanley, Feminism, Marriage, and Law in Victorian England, 1850-1895 (Princeton: Princeton University Press, 1989).
 Ben Griffin, Class, Gender, and Liberalism in Parliament, 1868-1882: The Case of the Married Women's Property Acts, The Historical Journal, Vol. 46, No. 1 (Mar., 2003), pp. 59–87.

References

External links

United Kingdom Acts of Parliament 1882
Women's rights legislation
Property law of the United Kingdom
Women's rights in the United Kingdom
1882 in women's history